John E. Otto (December 18, 1938 – April 22, 2020) was the acting director of the FBI in 1987.

A native of St. Paul, Minnesota, Otto served in the Marine Corps and attended St. Cloud State College, where he earned a B.S. in 1960, followed by four years of graduate study in educational administration at the University of Minnesota. As a grad student, he worked as a deputy sheriff for Ramsey County, Minnesota and for the Arden Hills, Minnesota police department, while teaching at a junior high school in St. Paul.

In 1964, Otto joined the FBI, moving up through the ranks to inspector and supervisor positions. After serving as special agent in charge of the Minneapolis and then Chicago field offices, Otto was promoted into management positions, becoming executive assistant director of Law Enforcement Services in 1981.

In 1987, Otto became acting director of the FBI when director William H. Webster was appointed to Director of Central Intelligence, and stepped down when William Sessions gained Senate approval.

In 1990, Sessions awarded Otto the first Medal of Meritorious Achievement. On his retirement the same year, Otto became a security official for Delta Air Lines.

He died three days before another Acting FBI Director, James B. Adams, almost 2 months before FBI Director, William S. Sessions, and 5 months after another Acting FBI Director, William Ruckelshaus.

Further reading

References

1938 births
2020 deaths
Directors of the Federal Bureau of Investigation
United States Marines
Delta Air Lines people
St. Cloud State University alumni
University of Minnesota College of Education and Human Development alumni
People from Saint Paul, Minnesota
People from Arden Hills, Minnesota
Military personnel from Minnesota
American police officers